Kim Jong-hak Production is a South Korean drama production company, currently operating as a subsidiary of gaming firm ESA Co., Ltd. It was established in February 1999 by South Korean television director and producer Kim Jong-hak.

It is the successor to Jcom, the company founded in 1992 by Kim and writer Song Ji-na.

Works

Managed people

Producers
 Lee Byung-hoon
 Lee Tae-gon
 Lee Sang-hoom
 Park Chan-yool
 Jang Jin
 Gong Soo-chang
 Choi Yoon-seok

Writers
 Song Ji-na
 Kang Eun-kyung
 Jung Sung-hee
 Choi Yoon-jung
 Kim In-young
 Lee Sun-hee
 Son Eun-hye
 Yeo Ji-na
 Shin Jung-goo
 Jo Myung-joo
 Lee Ki-won
 Jo Jung-hwa

Former managed people

Directors
 Lee Jae-kyoo (became founder and co-CEO of Film Monster Co.)
 Lee Kang-hoon (became founder and executive chairman of May Queen Pictures)
 Pyo Min-soo (became founder and co-CEO of Company Ching; also managed by C.A.M.P Entertainment)

Writers
 Jung Yoo-kyung (now managed by Pan Entertainment)
 Kim Yi-young (now managed by Mega Monster)
 Min Hyo-jung (now managed by iWill Media)
 Park Kyung-soo (now managed by Pan Entertainment)

References

External links
  

South Korean companies established in 1999
Mass media companies established in 1999
Television production companies of South Korea
Companies based in Seoul